Vexillifera is a genus of Amoebozoa.

It is possible for it to be present in swimming pools.

References

Amoebozoa genera
Discosea